Future Spa is the third album by Australian rock band The Fauves.  It was released in August 1996.

The album contained two songs that appeared in Triple J Hottest 100, 1996, "Dogs Are the Best People" at No.20 and "Self Abuser" at No.30. It was nominated for Best Alternative Album in the 1997 ARIA awards but lost to Spiderbait's Ivy and the Big Apples. In November 2008, The Age reported that the album had sold 15,000 copies, making it the best-selling Fauves album.

Cox noted, "There are so many things you can write about, yet rock tends to limit itself to a very narrow band of what's acceptable. This is just our attempt to broaden that a little. Even if the lyrics aren't great, at least they're different. None of us are claiming to be poets."

Track listing
(All songs written by The Fauves)
 "Big Brother Age" — 3:46
 "Don't Get Death Threats Anymore" — 3:22
 "Self Abuser" — 2:54
 "Sentimental Motel Journey" — 3:33
 "Dogs Are the Best People" — 2:49
 "I Love the Fight Game" — 2:35
 "Understanding Kyuss" — 2:53
 "That's the Lifestyle" — 4:13
 "Skateboard World Record" — 2:38
 "Tying One On" — 2:55
 "I Wrote You a Power Ballad" — 3:56
 "Dragster For Christmas" — 2:50
 "Suddenly Looked and Realised" — 2:48
 "Tighter Than I Like" — 19:45*

*Song ends at minute 4:40. After 5 minutes of silence, begins the hidden track, "Everybody's Getting a Three Piece Together" (9:40 - 12:40), followed by a police interview of two band members regarding a marijuana arrest and caution (12:40 - 19:40).

Personnel

 Phil Leonard — vocals, guitar
 Andrew Cox — vocals, guitar
 Andrew Dyer — bass, vocals
 Adam Newey — drums, vocals

Additional musicians
 Wayne Connolly — keyboards, guitar, mandolin, guitar, backing vocals
 Tim Cleaver — guitar ("I Love the Fight Game")
 Soultrain — guitar ("That's the Lifestyle)
 Louise Taylor — keyboards

References 

1996 albums
The Fauves albums